Megawatt Park is the South African site of the electricity public utility Eskom's head office in Sunninghill, Gauteng (City of Johannesburg Metropolitan Municipality). The park includes the Megawatt Park Conference Centre.

External links

Parks in Johannesburg
Energy in South Africa